Aquadulcaris pheronyx is a species of crustacean in family Paramelitidae. It is endemic to the Constantiaberg, a mountain near Cape Town, South Africa, and is listed as Critically Endangered on the IUCN Red List.

References

Gammaridea
Endemic crustaceans of South Africa
Taxonomy articles created by Polbot
Crustaceans described in 1992